The following is a timeline of the history of the city of Newark, New Jersey, United States.

Before 1800

 1666 - Robert Treat and other Puritans buy land from Hackensack tribe.
 1710s - Sydenham House and Plume House (residences) built (approximate date).
 1712 - Harrison Cider Apple created (approximate date).
 1726 - College of New Jersey founded.
 1730 - Presbyterianism superseded Congregationalism.
 1743 - Trinity Church built.
 1756 - Princeton College relocated from Newark to Princeton.
 1770 - One tannery operated.
 1774 - Newark Academy established.
 1780 - January 25: Elizabethtown and Newark Raid by British forces.
 1787 - First Presbyterian Church built.
 1791 - Woods's Newark Gazette begins publication.
 1798 - Three tanneries operating.
 1795 - Newark Plank Road to Bergen constructed (approximate date).
 1797 - Newark Fire Association founded.

1800s
 1803 - Newark Female Charitable Society founded.
 1810 - Weller's Circulating Library in business (approximate date).
 1814 - Newark Bible Society founded.
 1817 - Newark Colonization Society founded.
 1819 - Whybrew Circulating Library in business (approximate date).
 1823 - Smith & Wright saddlery in business (approximate date).
 1830 - Population: 10,953.
 1831 - Plane Street Church organized.
 1832 - Newark Daily Advertiser newspaper begins publication.
 1834 - Centre Street Bridge opens.
 1836 - Newark incorporated as a city.
 1837 - 155 curriers and patent leather makers in the city.
 1840
 Patterson & Ballantine Brewing Company in business.
 Population: 17,290.
 1844 - Mount Pleasant Cemetery established.
 1846 - New Jersey Historical Society headquartered in Newark.
 1847 - Library Association founded.
 1848 - Influx of Germans.
 1849 - Newark Daily Mercury newspaper begins publication.
 1850
 Bethel Mission established.
 Population: 38,894.
 1853 - Newark Daily Eagle newspaper begins publication.
 1857
 City police department established.
 Newark Orphan Asylum built.
 City charter.
 1858
 New Jersey Freie Zeitung German-language newspaper begins publication.
 Gottfried Krueger Brewing Company in business.
 1860 - Population: 71,941.
 1864 - Lyon & Son's brewing company in business.
 1865 - Murphy Varnish Company in business.
 1869
 Newark and New York Railroad begins operating.
 Newark City Cemetery in use.
 Newark Morning Register newspaper begins publication.
 1870 - Bee Hive dry goods shop in business (later Plaut & Co.)
 1872 - Newark Industrial Exposition begins.
 1874 - St. Stephen's Church built.
 1875 - Marshall & Ball clothing shop in business.
 1879 - Newark City Brewery in business.
 1880 - Newark Tribüne German-language newspaper begins publication.
 1881 - Newark Technical School established.
 1883 - Balbach electrolytic refinery opens.
 1884 - Prince Street Synagogue built.
 1885
 Johnston & Murphy and Lutz Cafe in business.
 1885 American Cup soccer tournament held.
 1886 - Miner's Newark Theater opens.
 1888 - First Baptist Peddie Memorial Church built.
 1889
 Newark Free Public Library opens.
 Jersey City, Newark and Western Railway incorporated.
 1890 - Population: 181,830.
 1893 - L. Bamberger & Company in business.
 1894
 Sacred Heart of Jesus Church built.
 Montagna Italian-language newspaper begins publication.
 1895 - Branch Brook Park established.
 1899 - Cathedral Basilica of the Sacred Heart construction begins.

1900s

1900-1909
 1900 - Population: 246,070.
 1901 
Beth Israel Hospital founded.
Newark Free Public Library opens its current location.
 1902 - Newark City Hall opened.
 1903
Jackson Street Bridge and Clay Street Bridge open.
 Roseville railroad station built.
Newark trolley accident kills 8 students
 1905
 La Revista Italian/English-language newspaper begins publication.
 Feigenspan mansion built.
 Automobile Renting Co. in business.
 1906
 Trees planted in Pequannock Watershed.
 Literary Stratemeyer Syndicate active.
 1907 - Essex County Courthouse built.
 1908
 Kronika Polish/English-language newspaper begins publication.
 St. Casimir's Church founded.
 1909 - Newark Museum established.

1910s
 1910
 Fire on High Street (now Martin Luther King Blvd) at factory kills 26
 Population: 347,469.
 1911 - Shubert Theatre opens.
 1912
 Adams Theatre and Empire Theatre built.
 Equestrian statue of George Washington by J. Massey Rhind dedicated in Washington Park
 1913
 Bridge Street Bridge opens.
 Moorish Science Temple of America headquartered in Newark.
 1914 - New Jersey Observer begins publication.
 1916
 Robert Treat Hotel in business.
 Military Park first opened.
 1917 - Urban League founded.

1920s
 1920 - Carrier air conditioning plant begins operating.
 1921 - Newark Morgen-Steren Yiddish/English-language newspaper begins publication.
 1922 - New Jersey Symphony Orchestra headquartered in city.
 1925
 Shriners Salaam Temple built.
 Newark Schools Stadium opens.
 1926 - Central Railroad of New Jersey Newark Bay Bridge and Davids' Stadium open.
 1927 - Stanley Theater opened.
 1928
 Newark Airport begins operating.
 New Jersey Luso-Americano Portuguese-language newspaper begins publication (approximate date).

1930s
 1930 - Lefcourt building constructed.
 1931 
Italian Tribune begins publication.
National Newark building opens.
 1935
 Newark City Subway begins operating.
 Newark Penn Station dedicated.
 1936 - University of Newark established.
 1939 - Newark Hot Club formed (music club).

1940s and 1950s
 1942
 Savoy Records founded.
 Hydeaway Bar in business.
 1949 - After Hours magazine begins publication.
 1954 - Cathedral Basilica of the Sacred Heart consecrated.
 1958 - September 15: Newark Bay rail accident.

1960s
 1960 - Population: 405,000.
 1962 - Youth Career Development Center initiated.
 1964 - Newark Symphony Hall established.
 1966 - New Jersey Symphony Boys Choir founded.
 1967
 July 12–17: 1967 Newark riots occur.
 July 20: Black power conference held in city.
 1969 - Ironbound Community Corporation and New Community Corporation founded.

1970s
 1970 - Kenneth Gibson becomes first African American mayor on the eastern seaboard.
1971 - Gateway Center built.
 1977 - City hosts first Islamic Conference of North America.
 1978 - August 20: Clinton Avenue Five boys disappear.
 1979 - Foreign trade zone established.

1980s
 1984 - Former Diamond Alkali plant site in Ironbound declared a Superfund site (polluted area).
 1986 - Sharpe James becomes mayor.
 1989
 Donald M. Payne becomes U.S. representative for New Jersey's 10th congressional district.
 Sister city relationship established with Aveiro, Portugal.

1990s
 1990 - Population: 275,221.
 1991 - Sister city relationship established with Banjul, Gambia.
 1992
 One Newark Center and Penn Plaza East building constructed.
 Sister city relationship established with Xuzhou, Jiangsu, China.
 1995 - Society Hill condo built.
 1997
 City website online.
 New Jersey Performing Arts Center opens.
 1999 - Bears Stadium opens.

2000s

2000-2009
 2000
 Newark Legal Center built.
 Population: 273,546.
 2002 - City's "Open Public Records Act Office" established.
 2003 - May 11: Murder of Sakia Gunn.
 2006
 Cory Booker becomes mayor.
 Garden State Rollergirls headquartered in city.
 2007
 Jewish Museum of New Jersey opens.
 Prudential Center built.

2010s
 2010
 Newark Archives Project begins.
 Population: 277,140; metro 18,897,109.
 2013 - November 4: Luis A. Quintana becomes interim mayor.
 2014 - Ras Baraka becomes mayor.

See also
 History of Newark, New Jersey
 National Register of Historic Places listings in Essex County, New Jersey
 List of Mayors of Newark, New Jersey
 Timeline of Jersey City, New Jersey
 Timeline of New Jersey

References

This article incorporates information from the Dutch Wikipedia.

Bibliography

Published in 19th century

1800s-1840s

1850s-1890s
 
 
 
 
 
 Martha J. Lamb, "Newark," Harper's New Monthly 53 (October 1876): 671–672.
 
 
 
 
 
 
 
 
 
 
  + 1889 ed.

Published in 20th century

1900s-1940s

 
 
 
 
 
 
 
 . v.1, v.2, v.3

1950s-1990s

Published in 21st century

External links

 
 Items related to Newark, various dates (via Digital Public Library of America)
 Items related to Newark, New Jersey, various dates (via Library of Congress, Prints & Photos division)

 
Newark
Newark
Years in New Jersey